Jeanne-Elisabeth Chaudet (née Gabiou; died 18 April 1832) was a French painter and the wife of the sculptor Antoine Denis Chaudet.

After the death of her first husband in 1810, she married, secondly, in 1812, to Pierre-Arsène Denis Husson, a civil servant. Her painting Portrait of Madame Villot, née Barbier, was included in the 1905 book Women Painters of the World. Chaudet was the sister-in-law of painter Marie-Élisabeth Gabiou;  she was also a distant cousin of Gabiou and her sisters, Marie-Denise Villers and Marie-Victoire Lemoine.

References

External links

 Jeanne-Elisabeth Chaudet profile, artnet.com; accessed 18 March 2015.

1760s births
1832 deaths
Painters from Paris
French women painters
Date of birth unknown
18th-century French painters
18th-century French women artists
19th-century French painters
19th-century French women artists